Giorgio Chiavacci (3 July 1899 – 4 March 1969) was an Italian fencer. He won a gold medal in the team foil competition at the 1928 Summer Olympics.

References

External links
 

1899 births
1969 deaths
Italian male fencers
Olympic fencers of Italy
Fencers at the 1924 Summer Olympics
Fencers at the 1928 Summer Olympics
Olympic gold medalists for Italy
Olympic medalists in fencing
People from Cecina, Tuscany
Medalists at the 1928 Summer Olympics
Sportspeople from the Province of Livorno